Bentazepam (also known as Thiadipone, Tiadipona) is a thienodiazepine which is a benzodiazepine analog.

It possesses anxiolytic, anticonvulsant, sedative and skeletal muscle relaxant properties.
Peak plasma rates are achieved in around 2,5 hours after oral administration. The elimination half-life is between approximately 2–4 hours. Bentazepam is effective as an anxiolytic.

A severe benzodiazepine overdose with bentazepam may result in coma and respiratory failure. Adverse effects include dry mouth, somnolence, asthenia, dyspepsia, constipation, nausea and drug-induced lymphocytic colitis has been associated with bentazepam. Severe liver damage and hepatitis has also been associated with bentazepam. Whilst liver failure from bentazepam is considered to be rare, liver function monitoring has been recommended for all patients taking bentazepam.

See also 
 List of benzodiazepines

References 

GABAA receptor positive allosteric modulators
Hypnotics
Lactams
Thienodiazepines